Laura Trott may refer to:

 Laura Kenny (née Trott), British track and road cyclist
 Laura Trott (politician), British Conservative Party politician